Eagle Cliff is an unincorporated community in Walker County, in the U.S. state of Georgia.

History
A post office called Eagle Cliff was established in 1860, and remained in operation until it was discontinued in 1904. The community took its name from a nearby cliff where eagles made their nests.

References

Unincorporated communities in Walker County, Georgia
Unincorporated communities in Georgia (U.S. state)